Mykola Krupnyk (born 2 September 1972) is a Ukrainian biathlete. He competed in the men's 20 km individual event at the 1998 Winter Olympics.

References

1972 births
Living people
Ukrainian male biathletes
Olympic biathletes of Ukraine
Biathletes at the 1998 Winter Olympics
Sportspeople from Kyiv